Akhayat (also known as Aşağı Dünya Obruğu)  is a sinkhole in Mersin Province, Turkey.

The Akhayat Sinkhole is located in a rural area of the Silifke ilçe (district), to the north of Atayurt town.

Geography
The sinkhole is situated to the north of Atayurt town in the rural area of Silifke district.

The sinkhole
There is a rock carved ancient ladder on the north west side. But a part of the ladder has been demolished and descending by using the ladder is dangerous. There are several man made caves on the walls of the sinkhole.  west of the sinkhole there are traces of an ancient settlement which was probably a cult center. It is thought that the sinkhole and the settlement were probably related to each other. There are rock tombs and altars to the south of the sinkhole

Tourism
There are other sinkholes in Mersin Province such as Cennet and Cehennem system and Kanlıdivane. Akhayat is relatively less known. Although it is possible to visit the site presently there is no touristic activity. But Silifke governor said that the site will be opened to tourism.

See also 
 List of sinkholes of Turkey

References

Sinkholes of Turkey
Silifke District
Landforms of Mersin Province